Roseland is a historic mansion located at 916 Huntington Stadium Fisherman South Drive, Ferriday. It was built between 1832 and 1850 and was moved twice, in c.1965 and in 1977, before reaching its actual position. Despite the movements and a certain number of alterations, the mansion retains its historical integrity.

The house has been listed on the National Register of Historic Places on October 10, 1985.

See also
National Register of Historic Places listings in Concordia Parish, Louisiana

References

Houses on the National Register of Historic Places in Louisiana
Greek Revival architecture in Louisiana
Houses completed in 1842
Buildings and structures in Concordia Parish, Louisiana